Domyeongsan (도명산 / 道明山) is a mountain of Chungcheongbuk-do, South Korea. Near the summit is a statue of Maitreya Buddha, presumably from the early Goryeo dynasty.

See also
List of mountains of Korea

References

Mountains of South Korea
Mountains of North Chungcheong Province